Futebol Clube Infesta (abbreviated as FC Infesta) is a Portuguese football club based in São Mamede de Infesta, Matosinhos in the district of Porto.

Background
FC Infesta currently plays in the Terceira Divisão Série B which is the fourth tier of Portuguese football. The club was founded in 1934 and they play their home matches at the Parque de Jogos Manuel Ramos in São Mamede de Infesta, Matosinhos. The stadium is able to accommodate 500 spectators.

The club is affiliated to Associação de Futebol do Porto and has competed in the AF Porto Taça. The club has also entered the national cup competition known as Taça de Portugal on many occasions.

Appearances

II Divisão B: 20
III Divisão: 14
Portuguese Cup: 34 (greatest result: 8th, 1996–97)

Season to season

Honours
AF Porto 1ª Divisão: 2010/11
AF Porto 1ª Divisão: 1983/84
AF Porto 2ª Divisão: 1939/40

Footnotes

External links
Official website 

Football clubs in Portugal
Association football clubs established in 1934
1934 establishments in Portugal